Argillophora is a genus of moths of the family Noctuidae.

Species
 Argillophora argillophora Dyar, 1914
 Argillophora furcilla Grote, 1873

References
 Argillophora at Markku Savela's Lepidoptera and Some Other Life Forms
 Natural History Museum Lepidoptera genus database

Acontiinae